Sharif Naidhajavovich Sharifov (born November 11, 1988 in Gunukh, Charodinsky District, Dagestan) is a Russian-Azerbaijani male wrestler of Avar descent. Sharifov finished first in the world championship and won bronze in the European championship. At the 2012 Summer Olympics Sharifov won a gold medal in the 84 kg event after defeating Puerto Rican Jaime Espinal.

He won a bronze medal at the 2016 Summer Olympics, where he beat Bi Shengfeng and Zbigniew Baranowski before losing to Abdulrashid Sadulaev. Sharifov won the bronze medal after beating Pedro Ceballos in the repechage.

References

External links
 

Living people
1988 births
Azerbaijani people of Dagestani descent
Azerbaijani male sport wrestlers
Olympic gold medalists for Azerbaijan
Olympic bronze medalists for Azerbaijan
Wrestlers at the 2012 Summer Olympics
Wrestlers at the 2016 Summer Olympics
Olympic wrestlers of Azerbaijan
Olympic medalists in wrestling
Medalists at the 2012 Summer Olympics
Medalists at the 2016 Summer Olympics
World Wrestling Championships medalists
People from Charodinsky District
People from Makhachkala
European Wrestling Championships medalists
Islamic Solidarity Games medalists in wrestling
Islamic Solidarity Games competitors for Azerbaijan
Wrestlers at the 2020 Summer Olympics